Stevie-O was a Canadian children's television series which aired on CBC Television in 1958.

Premise
Steve Woodman of Steve's Place at Montreal's CFCF radio hosted this series. He provided the voice for various puppets and introduced animated shorts.

Woodman previously hosted the CBC Television series In the Story Book (1956–57).

Scheduling
The 15-minute series was seen on Tuesday afternoons, beginning with its debut on 1 July 1958 at 4 pm. Successive episodes were broadcast at 5 pm until 21 September 1958, except for a 4 pm rescheduling on 22 July 1958 due to coverage of Princess Margaret's visit at Fort Langley.

References

CBC Television original programming
1950s Canadian children's television series
1958 Canadian television series debuts
1958 Canadian television series endings
Black-and-white Canadian television shows
Canadian television series with live action and animation
Canadian television shows featuring puppetry